Callisto Piazza (1500–1561) was an Italian painter.

Biography
Callisto, a member of the Piazza family of painters, was born in Lodi, Lombardy.

In 1523 he was working in Brescia. His first dated and signed work is from the following year, and shows a typical Brescian style. This style was then emerging, and included artists such as Romanino and Moretto. Piazza shows influences from contemporaries such as Dosso Dossi and Ludovico Mazzolino of the Ferrarese school, as well as Giovanni Agostino da Lodi.

In 1526–1529 Piazza worked in Val Camonica, at Erbanno, Borno, Breno, Esine and Cividate Camuno. In 1529 he returned to his native Lodi where he formed a workshop with his brothers Cesare and Scipione (died 1552). In 1538, while in Crema, he married the noblewoman Francesca Confalonieri. Later Callisto moved to Milan, where he received numerous commissions, such as the decoration of the San Girolamo chapel in Santa Maria presso San Celso (1542); the decoration of the refectory of the convent of Sant'Ambrogio (1545); the frescoes for the Saletta Negra in the Castello Sforzesco; and the decoration of the Simonetta chapel in San Maurizio al Monastero Maggiore (1555), largely executed with the assistance of his son Fulvio. He also worked in Lodi at the Incoronata (1454), Novara, at the Abbey of Chiaravalle and other areas of Lombardy.

His graphic style is often confused with that of Romanino, who exerted a deep influence on his work.

Callisto returned to Lodi in 1551 and died there ten years later.

External links
    
Painters of reality: the legacy of Leonardo and Caravaggio in Lombardy, an exhibition catalog from The Metropolitan Museum of Art (fully available online as PDF), which contains material on Piazza (see index)
Carl Brandon Strehlke, "Musical Group by Callisto Piazza (cat. 234)," in The John G. Johnson Collection: A History and Selected Works, a Philadelphia Museum of Art free digital publication.

1500 births
1561 deaths
People from Lodi, Lombardy
16th-century Italian painters
Italian male painters
Painters from Milan